Humberto Wilfrido Alonso Razo (born 9 August 1958) is a Mexican politician affiliated with the Party of the Democratic Revolution. As of 2014 he served as Deputy of the LX Legislature of the Mexican Congress representing Michoacán.

References

1958 births
Living people
Politicians from Michoacán
Members of the Chamber of Deputies (Mexico) for Michoacán
Party of the Democratic Revolution politicians
21st-century Mexican politicians
Deputies of the LX Legislature of Mexico